Édouard Roger-Vasselin and Nicolas Devilder were the defending champions but did not participate.No 2 seeds Dominik Meffert and Frederik Nielsen won the final against the No. 1 seeds Flavio Cipolla and Simone Vagnozzi, 7–6(7–4), 5–7, [10–5].

Seeds

Draw

Draw

References
 Main Draw

Internationaux de Nouvelle-Caledonie - Doubles
2011 - Doubles